The Battle on Vrtijeljka was fought on the hill of Vrtijeljka near Cetinje between a Venetian irregular force and an advancing Ottoman force on 7 May 1685 at the start of the Morean War. The Venetian force was made up of fighters from the neighbouring areas, including the band of acclaimed hajduk Bajo Pivljanin, and several Christian tribes. The large Ottoman force was led by sanjak-bey Süleyman of Scutari.

Prelude
Süleyman Pasha of Scutari readied to punish the Montenegrins (Ottoman subjects), who had helped the Republic of Venice, the Ottomans' main enemy in the Morean War. Süleyman sent word to the Montenegrins that, "due to their relations with Morlachs and Hajduks," he would exterminate them all. The leaders of the Kuči, Klimenti, and other tribes of the Highlands (Brda) were called and visited by Süleyman, who took 12 hostages from them and jailed these in Scutari. The Montenegrins were in the immediate Venetian–Ottoman frontier (krajina), east of the Bay of Kotor (a Venetian territory) and west of the Sanjak of Scutari.

The acclaimed hajduk Bajo Pivljanin had served the Republic of Venice with his band in the Bay of Kotor in the Cretan War and was dispatched to the bay (in 1684) to protect the area against the Ottomans.

Battle
The Montenegrins informed Venetian provveditore Antonio Zeno, who then quickly assembled approximately 1200 fighters (1,560 according to Pavel Rovinsky), including also Montenegrins, Mainjani, and Primorci, commanded by over-intendant Bošković, harambaša Bajo Pivljanin, and the guvernadur of Grbalj. Süleyman's large force crossed the Morača and headed towards Cetinje, while the hajduks rushed to meet them. The two met at the hill of Vrtijeljka on 7 May 1685.

The hajduks were defeated by the Ottomans, and Bajo fell. Zeno reported the casualties, of 22 Paštrovići, 27 from the Kotor area, and "worse yet for the Montenegrins, Poborci and Mainjani", but did not mention the hajduk losses in a similar way. Vule Subotić, the barjaktar of Bajo's band, recounted that the hajduks carried a war flag with Venetian symbols and that, out of 80, only 10 hajduks survived.

Aftermath and assessment
It has been claimed that the victorious Ottomans paraded with 500 severed heads through Cetinje after the battle, and also attacked the Cetinje monastery and the palace of Ivan Crnojević.

Süleyman had Bajo's head sent to the Sultan as a great war trophy. The importance of the battle is evident in the fact that the heads of Pivljanin and his hajduks decorated the entrance hall of the seraglio in Constantinople, and that Süleyman was elevated to pasha due to the victory. The severed heads were taken to Constantinople as proof of finishing the task and that the enemy was triumphantly defeated. Only heads of worthy, more prominent outlaws, of names and work that was well-known, had this treatment. Heads of hajduks were otherwise put on town palisades or on poles beside the road or crossroads. That multiple other hajduk heads were sent to Constantinople along with Pivljanin's could primarily be explained as the Ottomans' wanting to prominently display the defeat of a notable movement that had brought much grief to them.

The news of the battle was recorded in Rome on 27 May 1685: "two courageous leaders, one named Bajo, friend of captain Janko, and the other, captain Vuković the Arbanas, died"; the source states that the defeat was due to betrayal of Montenegrins in the battle. Historiography is divided on the issue of whether the Montenegrins really betrayed the hajduks in the battle; some believe that to avoid retaliation, the Montenegrins promised the head of Bajo Pivljanin, then betrayed the hajduks on the battlefield. Historian Radovan Samardžić is open to the view that maybe the Ragusans gave news of the ostensible betrayal of Montenegrins in the battle to disguise their own bad role in the event. According to Jovan Tomić, Antonio Zeno wrote two letters to the Senate about the battle, not mentioning the betrayal of the Montenegrins.

Legacy

References

Sources

Books

Journals

Vrtijeljka
17th century in Montenegro
Cetinje
Vrtijeljka
Vrtijeljka
Vrtijeljka
1685 in Europe
Ottoman period in the history of Montenegro
Vrtijeljka
Sanjak of Scutari
Venetian period in the history of Montenegro